Too Scared to Scream (also known as The Doorman) is a 1985 American independent slasher film directed by Tony Lo Bianco. It stars Mike Connors, who also produces, Anne Archer and Ian McShane. The film was originally filmed in 1981 and intended for a 1982 release but was shelved due to the production company going out of business and it didn't receive a theatrical release until 1985. It is known for its stellar supporting cast including John Heard, Maureen O'Sullivan and Murray Hamilton.

Premise
An unknown assailant is killing the tenants of an exclusive, high-rise apartment building in New York City.

Cast
 Mike Connors as Lieutenant Dinardo
 Anne Archer as Kate
 Leon Isaac Kennedy as Frank
 Ian McShane as Hardwick
 Ruth Ford as Irma
 John Heard as Lab Technician
 Carrie Nye as Graziella
 Maureen O'Sullivan as Mother
 Murray Hamilton as Jack
 Val Avery as Medical Examiner
 Sully Boyar as Sydney Blume
 Ken Norris as Mike
 Chet Doherty as Edward
 Karen Rushmore as Nadine
 Rony Clanton as Barker
 Beeson Carroll as Barry Moyer
 Victoria Bass as Cynthia Oberman
 Dick Boccelli as Benny
 Fred Ford as Man At Bar
 Ernesto Gasco as The Waiter
 Adrienne Howard as Louise
 Yvonne Talton Kersey as Mamie
 Gaetano Lisi as Guard
 Harry Madsen as Lyman
 John Ring as Irishman

External links

American independent films
American police detective films
1984 films
1985 films
American serial killer films
American mystery horror films
1980s crime thriller films
1980s slasher films
American slasher films
Crime horror films
1984 horror films
1985 horror films
21st Century Film Corporation films
1980s English-language films
1980s American films